The Wedding Bells is an American comedy-drama television series that aired on Fox from March 2 to April 6, 2007. The series was greenlighted after the network became interested in a series centered on wedding planners. The network approached David E. Kelley to create the show, and he essentially remade a rejected pilot he created for ABC in 2004 entitled DeMarco Affairs which starred Selma Blair, Lindsay Sloane, and Sabrina Lloyd as three sisters who inherit a wedding planner service. Though the show had a moderately strong premiere, it faded in the ratings and was cancelled after seven episodes had been produced and five episodes were aired.

Plot
The Bell sisters, Annie (KaDee Strickland), Jane (Teri Polo) and Sammy Bell (Sarah Jones), inherited "The Wedding Palace" after their parents' divorce. David Conlon (Michael Landes), photographer for The Wedding Palace and ex-boyfriend of Annie's whose tension-filled dealings with her are clearly the result of pent-up sexual chemistry; and Russell Hawkins (Benjamin King), Jane's husband and the company COO; round off the cast.

Then there's wedding singer Ralph Snow (Chris Williams), who always aspired to be the next Lenny Kravitz, but instead is stuck crooning endless cover songs and retro medleys for unappreciative wedding guests. Amanda Pontell (Missi Pyle) adds to the frenzied scene as a former bridezilla client who becomes a board member of The Wedding Palace.

B-plots through the brief run of the series
 The relationship between Wedding Palace assistant Debbie (Sherri Shepherd) and another wedding singer (Cleavant Derricks in a recurring role). Her biological clock is ticking and he is cautious about getting married again, as his first marriage ended badly.
 The very rich (but socially awkward) Amanda Pontell's efforts to fit in with the three Bell sisters.
 Sammy Bell's (Sarah Jones) efforts to be seen as a whole woman, not just as a sexy woman.
 Sibling rivalry between Jane (Teri Polo) and Annie (KaDee Strickland) -- there is a history of Jane's boyfriends becoming attracted to Annie—and Jane and Sammy—Sammy has read in Jane's diary that Jane is jealous of Sammy's breasts.
 Had the series gone on, another secondary plot might have been about Russell's efforts to franchise the Wedding Palace. Christopher Rich played a potential investor with Las Vegas connections in the last aired episode.
 A couple of episodes had Heather Tom and Nicholle Tom as buxom blonde sisters who would crash weddings. Debbie would inevitably throw them out.

Cast
KaDee Strickland as Annie Bell
Teri Polo as Jane Bell
Sarah Jones as Sammy Bell
Michael Landes as David Conlon
Benjamin King as Russell Hawkins
Chris Williams as Ralph Snow
Missi Pyle as Amanda Pontell
Costas Mandylor as Ernesto
Sherri Shepherd as Debbie Quill

Episodes

Reception
The first two episodes of The Wedding Bells garnered poor reviews and low ratings. Critics cited the superficial relationships between the sisters as a weakness. Some claim that Kelley lacked the flair to write for women, after his successful run with Ally McBeal.

References

External links
 

2000s American comedy-drama television series
2007 American television series debuts
2007 American television series endings
English-language television shows
Fox Broadcasting Company original programming
Television series by 20th Century Fox Television
Wedding television shows
Television series created by David E. Kelley